The first session of the United Nations General Assembly opened on 10 January 1946 at the Methodist Central Hall in London.

Gladwyn Jebb, executive secretary of the UN, notified Dr. Eduardo Zuleta Angel, head of the Colombian delegation to the UN and chairman of the Preparatory Commission of the United Nations, called the meeting to order. Paul-Henri Spaak of Belgium was elected the first president of the General Assembly in a 28–23 vote, prevailing over Trygve Lie (who went on to be the first Secretary General of the UN).

The second meeting of the first session opened in Flushing Meadows–Corona Park, New York, on 23 October 1946.

References

1
1946 in international relations
1946 in London
Conferences in London
1946 in the United Nations